The 1997–98 Honduran Segunda División was the 31st season of the Honduran Segunda División.  Under the management of Alfonso Navarro, Alianza won the tournament after defeating C.D. Real Sociedad in the final series and obtained promotion to the 1998–99 Honduran Liga Nacional.

Final

 Alianza won 3–2 on aggregate.
 It is unclear how Broncos was promoted to 1998–99 Honduran Liga Nacional instead of Alianza.

References

Segunda
1997